The 2014 Victoria Azarenka tennis season officially began at the 2014 Brisbane International, the first of two simultaneous events which opened the 2014 season, and ended with a second round loss to Ana Ivanovic at the Pan Pacific Open in Tokyo in September.

Yearly summary

Australian Open series
Azarenka began her 2014 season as the second seed at the 2014 Brisbane International, in what was her third participation at the event. She reached the final for the first time since 2009, but lost to world No. 1 Serena Williams in straight sets.

Her next tournament was the Australian Open, where she was the two-time defending champion. She failed to defend her title, losing in the quarter-finals to Agnieszka Radwańska in three sets.

Middle East series
Azarenka was due to play in the Qatar Total Open, where she was the two-time defending champion, but she withdrew before the tournament started due to a left foot injury.

American hard court season
Azarenka returned from her foot injury at the Indian Wells Masters, but she lost her first match to Lauren Davis, marking her earliest ever exit from Indian Wells. A recurrence of her foot injury at Indian Wells later forced her withdrawal from Miami for the second consecutive year.

Azarenka withdrew from the Monterrey Open for the second consecutive year.

Clay court season
Azarenka was scheduled to play at both the Madrid Open and the Italian Open, however she withdrew from both tournaments after failing to recover from a left foot injury. Her absences from both events resulted in her dropping out of the top four for the first time since May 2011. She ultimately withdrew from the French Open after failing to recover in time for the event.

Grass court season
After three months out due to a foot injury, Azarenka returned to the Tour at the Eastbourne International as a wildcard entry. She drew world No. 44 Camila Giorgi in the first round, and was defeated in three sets.

Azarenka then played at Wimbledon, where she lost in the second round for the second year running; after defeating Mirjana Lučić-Baroni in the first round for her first win since January, she lost to Bojana Jovanovski in the second in three sets.

US Open series
Azarenka started her US Open series campaign as a wildcard entry at the Bank of the West Classic in Stanford. After receiving a second round bye, she was defeated in the second round by Venus Williams in straight sets; as a result of that loss, she dropped out of the top ten for the first time since September 2010. She had marked her 200th consecutive week in the top ten in the week of Stanford.

Azarenka's spell outside the top ten lasted just one week; by reaching the quarter-finals of the Rogers Cup, where she lost to Agnieszka Radwańska for the second time this season, she re-entered the top ten in the week starting 11 August 2014 at the expense of Ana Ivanovic.

She later withdrew from the Cincinnati Masters due to a right knee injury she suffered at the Rogers Cup. This defeat has, again, seen her drop out of the top ten as she was the defending champion.

At the US Open, Azarenka reached the quarter-finals for the third consecutive year, but was upset by Ekaterina Makarova in straight sets. The loss saw Azarenka drop out of the top 20 for the first time in over six years.

Asian hard court season
After the US Open, Azarenka commenced her Asian swing at the downgraded Premier tournament in Tokyo, where she was unseeded. She defeated Kimiko Date-Krumm in the first round in three sets, before losing to fellow former world number one and eventual champion Ana Ivanovic in the second in straight sets. She was then scheduled to play at the inaugural 2014 Wuhan Open and the China Open, however she announced that she will miss the remainder of the season due to knee and foot injuries.

All matches

Singles matches

Tournament schedule

Singles schedule
Victoria Azarenka's 2014 singles tournament schedule is as follows:

Yearly Records

Head-to-head match-ups
Bold indicates that the player was in the Top 10, italics denotes that the player was in the Top 20 (at the time of the match being played). This list is ordered by number of wins to number of losses in chronological order played.

Finals

Singles: 1 (0–1)

Earnings

 Figures in United States dollars (USD) unless noted.

See also
2014 Li Na tennis season
2014 Maria Sharapova tennis season
2014 Serena Williams tennis season
2014 WTA Tour

References

Azarenka
Victoria Azarenka tennis seasons
2014 in Belarusian sport
Tennis in Belarus